The Society for Prevention Research (SPR) is an American non-profit learned society dedicated to prevention science.

History
The Society for Prevention Research was established in 1991 at a meeting of National Institute on Drug Abuse staff and prevention research center directors held in Pittsburgh, Pennsylvania. By the following spring, it was incorporated as a non-profit organization in New York. Steven P. Schinke served as the Society's first president from 1993 to 1995. In 2000, its official journal, Prevention Science, was established.

Presidents
The president of the Society for Prevention Research is Guillermo "Willy" Prado. The following is a partial list of the Society's past presidents:

1993–1995: Steven P. Schinke
1995–1997: Richard Clayton
1997–1998: Karol Kumpfer
1998 (interim): Richard Clayton
1998–2001: Sheppard Kellam
2001–2003: Gilbert Botvin
2003–2005: J. David Hawkins
2005–2007: Anthony Biglan 
2007–2009: Zili Sloboda
2009–2011: Linda Collins
2011–2013: Deborah Gorman-Smith
2013–2015: Felipe Gonzalez Castro

References

External links

Organizations established in 1991
1991 establishments in Pennsylvania
Scientific organizations based in the United States
Non-profit organizations based in Fairfax, Virginia